Non-Format is a contemporary London-based Anglo-Scandinavian graphic design team specialising in design projects for the publishing and music industries.  The firm was founded by Kjell Ekhorn and Jon Forss in 2000.  They have worked for The Leaf Label and also closely with Lo Recordings, whom they have designed a vast majority of well over 60 releases with. They created artwork for Stateless for both their album and singles. They are also responsible for the recent complete redesign and art direction of the monthly British music magazine The Wire.

References

External links 
Non-Format Official Homepage

Graphic design studios
2000 establishments in England